Saint-Privat-d'Allier (literally Saint-Privat of Allier) is a commune in the Haute-Loire department in south-central France. On 1 January 2017, the former commune of Saint-Didier-d'Allier was merged into Saint-Privat-d'Allier.

Population

See also
Communes of the Haute-Loire department

References

Communes of Haute-Loire

Communes nouvelles of Haute-Loire